Mad Dog Morgan is a 1976 Australian bushranger film directed by Philippe Mora and starring Dennis Hopper, Jack Thompson and David Gulpilil. It is based upon the life of Dan Morgan.

Plot
Dan Morgan witnesses the (fictitious) bloody massacre of Chinese on the goldfields and turns into a robber. He is arrested and sent to prison for six years where he is tormented and raped. He is let out on parole and becomes a bushranger, befriending an Aboriginal man, Billy. Morgan fights against the vicious Superintendent Cobham and is eventually killed.

Cast

Dennis Hopper as Dan Morgan
Jack Thompson as Detective Manwaring
David Gulpilil as Billy
Frank Thring as Superintendent Cobham
Michael Pate as Superintendent Winch
Wallas Eaton as Macpherson
Bill Hunter as Sergeant Smith
John Hargreaves as Baylis
Martin Harris as Wendlan
Robin Ramsay as Roget
Graeme Blundell as Italian Jack
Gregory Apps as Arthur
Liza Lee-Atkinson as Barmaid
Elaine Baillie as Farm Girl
Don Barkham as Morrow
Kurt Beimel as Dr. Dobbyn
David Bracks as McLean
Liddy Clark as Alice
Peter Collingwood as Judge Barry
Peter Cummins as Gibson
John Derum as Evans
Gerry Duggan as Martin
Max Fairchild as Prisoner
Chuck Faulkner as Sergeant Montford
Judith Fisher as Mrs. Warby
Alan Hardy as Bob
Isobel Harley as Mrs. Macpherson
David John as John Evans
Norman Kaye as Swagman
Hugh Keays-Byrne as Simon
Kevin Leslie as Maples
Robert McDarra as Parole Officer
David Mitchell as Haley
Christopher Pate as Roget's Assistant
Grant Page as Maginnity
Philip Ross as Watson
Bruce Spence as Heriot
Peter Thompson as Mayor
Roger Ward as Trooper
Ken Weaver as Bond

Production
Mad Dog Morgan is based on the book Morgan: The Bold Bushranger, by Margaret Frances Carnegie. Mora wrote the script on a ship voyage from London to Melbourne in 1974. This was submitted to the Australian Film Development Corporation in early 1975 who agreed to support it.

The budget was raised from the Australian Film Commission (what the AFDC turned into), Greater Union and private investment, including Mora's father Georges, Margaret Carnegie, tycoon Victor Smorgon and Lyn Williams, the wife of artist Fred Williams.

Mora and producer Jeremy Thomas flew to Los Angeles to cast the lead role. Their first choice, Stacy Keach turned it down; Martin Sheen and Jason Miller expressed interest in playing Morgan but Mora decided to cast Dennis Hopper instead. Hopper's fee was $50,000.

The film used various locations where Dan Morgan had been active, in the eastern Riverina, including Billabong Creek, Culcairn and Jindera; as well as locations in Beechworth, north-east Victoria. Morgan's cave in the film was the actual cave Dan Morgan had used. Shooting started on 27 October 1975 and went for six weeks over 36 shooting days to 6 December. The shoot was challenged by rain during the first week but managed to be completed on schedule.

Producer Jeremy Thomas later remembered his experience making the film:

Mora later wrote that he was "setting grotesque 19th-century human behaviour against an extraordinary landscape. I created Francis Bacon figures in a Sidney Nolan landscape, with stunts inspired by Jean Cocteau." The director says that Hopper was a handful during the making of the film, constantly imbibing drink and drugs. However he says the actor could be very professional, a skilful improviser and gave a performance which was "really extraordinary. I think he identified with the role." Mora recalled Hopper at the finish of the shoot:

Mora shot a scene where a young Ned Kelly looks at a waxwork of Morgan but decided not to use it.

The making of Mad Dog Morgan was featured in Mark Hartley's 2008 documentary Not Quite Hollywood: The Wild, Untold Story of Ozploitation!, in which Thomas, Mora and Hopper are interviewed.

Release
The film was released in Australia and the US and performed disappointingly at the box office, returning to the producers an estimated $100,000. Mora later wrote:

However the movie sold well around the world – including a $300,000 sale to the US – and achieved good reviews.

Mora tried for several years to set up other films in Australia – including the movie that became Newsfront (1978), an adaptation of For the Term of His Natural Life and a science fiction story called The Black Hole – but was unsuccessful. He moved back overseas where executives at United Artists, who had been impressed by Mad Dog Morgan, hired Mora to direct The Beast Within.

Tromasterpiece Collection
Troma Entertainment's original VHS and DVD release was a heavily edited version of the film, seeing that the unrated or uncut versions were very difficult to come by outside of Australia.

With the intent of re-releasing the best films in the Troma library, The Tromasterpiece Collection released a 2-disc unrated version of the film in the US in November 2009.

Special features include interviews with director Philippe Mora, cinematographer Mike Molloy and associate producer Richard Brennan, along with a radio interview, deleted scenes, locations featurette, stills gallery and the original theatrical program.

Two graphic trailers were released for the DVD launch.

Director's Cut
Umbrella Entertainment (Australia) released a Director's Cut of the film on DVD in early 2009.

The DVD featured a fully restored print of the film, presented in an aspect ratio of 2:35:1.

The single disc included:
 
– They Shoot a Mad Dog: The Making of Mad Dog Morgan, a 23-minute documentary 
– That's Our Mad Dog: Dennis Hopper interviewed by Philippe Mora - a new 30-minute documentary

Further extras included an audio commentary by director Philippe Mora; film excerpts; a radio interview; a stills gallery, a reprint of the film's original release theatre programme; and a .pdf file of the original shooting script.

Accolades

Reception
The critic John Simon wrote about Mad Dog Morgan: "Whoever can find me a film more arrhythmic and incoherent – indeed inept – gets a reward in the shape of the ears of a wombat".

Copyright issues
The film's title screen copyright notice had an error with the Roman numerals, showing it as Copyright "MCMDXXVI" The "D" (500) should have been an "L" (50). Under American law this would have invalidated the Copyright entirely and placed the film in the public domain. However, as an Australian film, Australian law is unclear how the film is considered.

References

External links
 
 
 Mad Dog Morgan at Australian Screen Online
 Mad Dog Morgan at Oz Movies
  Mad Dog Morgan – at the Troma Entertainment movie database
 

1976 films
1976 independent films
1976 Western (genre) films
Australian Western (genre) films
Bushranger films
Australian independent films
Troma Entertainment films
Films set in colonial Australia
Films set in 1865
Films set in the 1860s
Films directed by Philippe Mora
Films produced by Jeremy Thomas
1976 drama films
1970s biographical films
Australian biographical films
Biographical films about bandits
Australian films about revenge
Australian vigilante films
1970s exploitation films
1970s English-language films